The fifth season of the American television comedy series Rules of Engagement premiered on September 20, 2010. It consisted of 24 episodes, each running approximately 22 minutes in length, marking the first and only time that the program received a full-season order. CBS initially broadcast the fifth season on Mondays at 8:30 pm ET in the United States between How I Met Your Mother and Two and a Half Men. In February, the show moved to 8:30 ET on Thursdays, following The Big Bang Theory.

Cast

Main Cast
 Patrick Warburton as Jeff Bingham
 Megyn Price as Audrey Bingham
 Oliver Hudson as Adam Rhodes
 Bianca Kajlich as Jennifer Morgan
 David Spade as Russell Dunbar
 Adhir Kalyan as Timmy Patel

Recurring Cast
 Diane Sellers as Doreen
 Sara Rue as Brenda
 Wendi McLendon-Covey as Liz
 Taryn Southern as Allison

Episodes

Ratings

References

2010 American television seasons
2011 American television seasons